Joey Kent (born April 23, 1974) is a former American football wide receiver in the National Football League (NFL). He was drafted by the Tennessee Oilers in the second round of the 1997 NFL Draft. He played college football at Tennessee where he holds the schools records for career receptions, receiving yards and receiving touchdowns. In 1999, the Titans made it to Super Bowl XXXIV, in which Kent appeared as a substitute. However, they lost to the Kurt Warner-led St. Louis Rams.

Kent also played for the Indianapolis Colts and Minnesota Vikings.

References

1974 births
Living people
American football wide receivers
Tennessee Volunteers football players
Tennessee Oilers players
Tennessee Titans players
Indianapolis Colts players
Minnesota Vikings players